Una River may refer to:

 Una (Sava), a river in Bosnia and Croatia, tributary to Sava
 Una River (Pernambuco), in northeastern Brazil
 Una River (Paraíba), in northeastern Brazil
 In Bahia, eastern Brazil:
Una River (Itaete, Bahia), a tributary of the Paraguaçu River
Una River (Una, Bahia), a river that flows past the municipality of Una and empties into the Atlantic Ocean
Una River (Valença, Bahia), a river that flows past the municipality of Valença and empties into the Atlantic Ocean
 Una River (Rio de Janeiro), in southeastern Brazil
 D'Una River, Santa Caterina, Brazil
 Una da Aldeia River, São Paulo, Brazil

See also
 Una (disambiguation)